Sanctorum Meritis was the hymn at First and Second Vespers in the Common of the Martyrs in the Roman Breviary.

References

Latin-language Christian hymns
Liturgy of the Hours